Llanquihue National Reserve is a national reserve of Chile. The reserve is bordered by the Petrohué River on the northeast and by the Reloncaví Estuary on the east. To the south, Chapo Lake and its shoreline is an intermediate area between the reserve and Alerce Andino National Park.

References

National reserves of Chile
Protected areas of Los Lagos Region
Valdivian temperate rainforest